The Association of Reformed Institutions of Higher Education (ARIHE), recently renamed Association of Reformed Colleges and Universities https://web.archive.org/web/20170622202630/http://reformedcolleges.org/ is an affiliate of the International Association for Promotion of Christian Higher Education, as the latter's North American Region.  IRIHE's member institutions currently include:

 Calvin University (Grand Rapids, Michigan) is affiliated with the Christian Reformed Church in North America. 
 Covenant College (Lookout Mountain, Georgia) is affiliated with the Presbyterian Church in America, 
 Dordt University (Sioux Center, Iowa) is related to local bodies of the Christian Reformed Church in North America, but exercises a high degree of self-governance.
 Geneva College (Beaver Falls, Pennsylvania) is affiliated with the Reformed Presbyterian Church in North America, 
 Institute for Christian Studies (Toronto, Ontario) is an independent Christian graduate school in philosophy. ICS is not a function of either State or Church, but has close relations with members of the Christian Reformed Church who independently join ICS's administering association.  Members of many other denominations are also among this core constituency. ICS has recently been granted by the Province of Ontario the right to grant degrees fully on its own, both the Master of Arts in Philosophy (a two-year program) and the Doctor of Philosophy in philosophy or the philosophical foundations of a specialist discipline within ICS's competence, in relation to the Free University in Amsterdam where to date the final oral examination for the published PhD is defended and graded. ICS also offers a one-year degree, Master of Worldview Studies (MWS) that is recognized in many places around the world.
 New Saint Andrews College (Moscow, ID) is an independent, classical Christian liberal arts college, founded in 1994, offering associate, bachelor, and master's degrees. Faculty members must be confessionally Reformed and the members of the Board of Trustees must be ministers or elders in the Communion of Reformed Evangelical Churches (CREC).
 Providence Christian College (Ontario, CA) is an independent confessionally Presbyterian and Reformed liberal arts college in southern California, founded in 2005.
 Redeemer University (Ancaster, Ontario) is an independent Christian undergraduate school offering bachelor's degrees recognized by the Province of Ontario. Its governing association is composed of members from a variety of Reformed denominations.
 The King's University (Edmonton, Alberta) is an independent Christian undergraduate school offering bachelor's degrees. Members of its governing association belong to a variety of Reformed denominations.
 Trinity Christian College (Palos Heights, Illinois) has a close relation to the Christian Reformed Churches in the Chicago metropolitan area.

IAPCHE maintains an office on the campus of Dordt University, and carries IRHE information in its online newsletter. Various ARIHE documents may be downloaded from the Internet in PDF format.

See also
List of Calvinist educational institutions in North_America
Association of Presbyterian Colleges and Universities
List of Lutheran colleges and universities in the United States
Council for Christian Colleges and Universities

International organizations based in the Americas
International Christian organizations